The results of the 2015 parliamentary elections in Azerbaijan by constituency.

References

2015 2
2015 in Azerbaijan
Election results in Azerbaijan